Peter Vyncke (12 January 1971) is a Belgian entrepreneur and Co-CEO of the Vyncke company, active in combustion technology. He manages the global family business together with his brother Dieter Vyncke.

Personal life and education 
Peter, son of Dirk and Daisy Vyncke, is the oldest of 4 siblings. He was born in Kortrijk, and raised in Harelbeke. Peter graduated from the KU Leuven University in 1994 (TEW) where he was preses of Ekonomika in 1993-1994. Between 1996 and 2000 Peter led the Asian branch of the family business in Kuala Lumpur, Malaysia. In 2020 he moved to Singapore to manage the company in the proximity of its Asian customers.

Career 
In 2002, Peter and Dieter Vyncke took over the family business (4th generation) from their parents and sisters. The company began to quickly expand across the world, establishing a strong reputation in quality, standards, stability, and craftsmanship. Their management style is having trust in the employees, and a continued adaptability to changing technology and business conditions. The corona crisis in 2020 required significant flexibility.

Awards and membership 
In 2007, Peter was elected as JCI’s Youngh Flemisch entrepreneur. He is a member of iGMO. Being a member of the management team of Voka, he was nominated as Manager of the year 2015, and 2016. Peter and Dieter Vyncke were nominated Honorary citizen of Harelbeke in 2016. He is a Flemish nationalist.

References 

Flemish businesspeople
1971 births
Living people